The 2016–17 season is the 115th season of competitive football in Italy.

Promotions and relegations (pre-season)
Teams promoted to Serie A
 Crotone
 Cagliari
 Pescara

Teams relegated from Serie A
 Carpi
 Frosinone
 Hellas Verona

Teams promoted to Serie B
 Cittadella
 SPAL
 Benevento
 Pisa

Teams relegated from Serie B
 Como
 Livorno
 Modena
 Virtus Lanciano

National teams

Italy national football team

UEFA Euro 2016

Group stage

Round of 16

Quarter-final

Friendlies

2018 FIFA World Cup qualification

League season

Serie A

Serie B

Lega Pro

Serie D

Cup competitions

Supercoppa Italiana

Coppa Italia

Juventus

UEFA Champions League

Group stage

Knockout phase

Round of 16

Quarter-finals

Semi-finals

Final

References 

 
Seasons in Italian football
Football
2016 in association football
Football
2017 in association football